Gordon Beznoska (April 3, 1949 – June 24, 2017) was an American politician. He served as a Democratic member for the 63rd district of the Oklahoma House of Representatives.

Life and career 
Beznoska was born in Geronimo, Oklahoma, the son of Golda Mae and Adolph Beznoska.

In 1971, Beznoska was elected to represent the 63rd district of the Oklahoma House of Representatives, succeeding D. D. Raibourn. He served until 1977, when he was succeeded by Marvin Baughman.

Beznoska died in June 2017, at the age of 68.

References 

1949 births
2017 deaths
20th-century Members of the Oklahoma House of Representatives
Democratic Party members of the Oklahoma House of Representatives
People from Comanche County, Oklahoma